Özdemir Sabancı (May 15, 1941 – January 9, 1996) was a Turkish businessman and a second generation member of the Sabancı family.

Biography
He was born in Adana, Turkey. After finishing the high school at the Tarsus American College in Tarsus, province Mersin, he received his B.A. degree in chemical engineering from the University of Manchester Institute of Science and Technology (UMIST), UK. Later, he obtained a master's degree in the same discipline in Switzerland.

Returned to Turkey, he worked in the Sabancı Holding and soon founded and further developed the synthetic fibres producer Sasa, one of the biggest industrial companies of the group. Under his leadership, Sabancı Holding entered into the automotive sector. He established several joint-venture projects with major Japanese companies including production of Mitsubishi coaches and trucks, Komatsu construction equipment, loaders and forklifts. In 1990, he paved the way to produce Toyota cars in Turkey as a consequence of the largest Turkish-Japanese partnership.

In the board of directors of the holding, he was responsible for the Group of Synthetic Fibers, Automotive and Plastics.

Özdemir Sabancı was gunned down on January 9, 1996, in his office in the strongly guarded Sabancı Towers in Levent, Istanbul, along with the general manager of ToyotaSA and a secretary by assassins hired by the leftist armed group DHKP-C. They had been given access to the building by Fehriye Erdal, a female member of DHKP-C, who was an employee at that time. Recently released information has suggested that the assassination of Özdemir Sabancı's assassin Mustafa Duyar was planned by retired general Veli Küçük, who was detained in the Ergenekon investigation.

Özdemir Sabancı was laid to rest at the Adana Asri Cemetery. He was survived by his wife Sevda, his son Demir and his daughter Serra (1975).

See also
 List of assassinated people from Turkey

References

1941 births
Businesspeople from Adana
Tarsus American College alumni
Ozdemir Sabanci
1996 deaths
Assassinated Turkish businesspeople
Deaths by firearm in Turkey
People murdered in Turkey
Terrorism deaths in Turkey
Turkish terrorism victims
Burials at Adana Asri Cemetery
1996 murders in Turkey